Hilary Leith (born December 29, 1983) is a Canadian rugby union player. She represented  at the 2014 Women's Rugby World Cup and was named to the tournament Dream Team. She made her international debut in the 2013 Nations Cup. Later that year she played for the Saracens.

She participated in wrestling and pursued it after high school after receiving a wrestling scholarship to the University of Missouri.

References

External links
Rugby Canada Player Profile 

1983 births
Living people
Canadian female rugby union players
Canada women's international rugby union players